Henri Lemay (22 August 1939 – 4 April 2021) was a Canadian politician and professor. A member of the Parti Québécois, he served on the National Assembly of Quebec for Gaspé from 1981 to 1985, and from 1983 to 1984, he was Parliamentary Assistant to the Minister of Agriculture, Fisheries and Food of Quebec. He also served as Deputy Minister of Municipal Affairs and Housing of Quebec from 1984 to 1985.

Henri Lemay died in Quebec City on 4 April 2021 at the age of 81.

References

1939 births
2021 deaths
French Quebecers
Members of the Executive Council of Quebec
Members of the National Assembly of Quebec
Parti Québécois politicians
People from Gaspé, Quebec